Xələftala (also, Khalaftala and Khalatala) is a village and municipality in the Qakh Rayon of Azerbaijan. It has a population of 118.  The municipality consists of the villages of Xələftala, Qımırlı, and Keşqutan.

References 

Populated places in Qakh District